Zdzieci Stare  (till December 31, 2000 as at Stare Zdzieci) is a village in the administrative district of Gmina Połaniec, within Staszów County, Świętokrzyskie Voivodeship, in south-central Poland.

The village has a population of  215.

Demography 
According to the 2002 Poland census, there were 206 people residing in Zdzieci Stare village, of whom 51% were male and 49% were female. In the village, the population was spread out, with 21.8% under the age of 18, 37.9% from 18 to 44, 18% from 45 to 64, and 22.3% who were 65 years of age or older.
 Figure 1. Population pyramid of village in 2002 — by age group and sex

References

Zdzieci Stare